The Hochschule für Musik Detmold is a university-level music school situated in Detmold, Germany.

Academics 

The Hochschule offers performance degrees in composition, all orchestral instruments, piano, voice, opera, art-song, conducting, as well as degrees in church music and music education. Artistic Music Production (Musik-Tonmeister) is also offered at the  Institute.

Structure 

In 2007 there were 594 students matriculated, plus an additional 22 junior students. The Hochschule offers about 300 concerts per year. The present director is Professor Martin Christian Vogel. In 2008 he was re-elected to a further appointment. Associate directors are professors André Stärk and Norbert Stertz. Hans Bertels was appointed chancellor in May 2007. In December 2006 the Hochschule für Music Detmold Foundation was formed to help finance extraordinary activities. An alumni association was founded in October 2006; its present chairman is Prof. Martin Christoph Redel.

History 

After initial planning that started in 1944, the Hochschule was founded in 1946 as Nordwestdeutsche Musikakademie Detmold.  In 1956 the name was officially expanded to Nordwestdeutsche Musikakademie Detmold, Staatliche Hochschule für Musik. After the Hochschule in Münster and Dortmund were officially merged with the Detmold Hochschule, the name was changed again in 1972 to Staatliche Hochschule für Musik Westfalen-Lippe. Nordwestdeutsche Musikakademie Detmold, with campuses in Münster and Dortmund. In 1987 the present name was given: Hochschule für Musik Detmold. In 2003, the Münster campus separated and became the Musikhochschule Münster and part of the Westfälische Wilhelms-Universität Münster. The Dortmund campus was closed in 2004.

The first director was Professor  from 1946 to 1959. The second director was Dr. Martin Stephani from 1959 to 1980. Stephani was also professor of conducting and conductor of the Hochschule's orchestra.

Campus 

The Hochschule has ten specifically equipped buildings at its disposal, which are arranged as a campus in and around the gardens of the : string-players, wind-instruments, singers and percussionists have their own buildings; pianists and organists reside in the historic palace, where rehearsals and concerts for larger chamber music groups also take place. The musicologists work in an Art Nouveau building at the outskirts of the gardens, whereas music-education students and future music teachers hold their academic seminars in the technically excellently equipped Pädagogikhaus.

Also at the fringe of the campus, opera students may use the historic Sommertheater, to gain concert experience and the taste of a fully staged opera performance. The Erich Thienhaus Institute is built directly onto the large concert hall. The concert hall is equipped with a unique spatial audio rendering technique (Wave Field Synthesis). About 180 artists and teachers as well as the many national and international partners work at the Hochschule. Students from Detmold are very often found among prize-winners in competitions. They are represented not only in the contemporary classical music scene in all important opera houses and orchestras, but also work worldwide in prominent positions as teachers in universities, academies and music schools.

Notable alumni 

María Bayo
Daniel Beckmann
Frank Beermann
Christina Brabetz
Ingeborg Danz
Christina Gerstberger
Sébastien Hurtaud
Mungonzazal Janshindulam
Dirk Kaftan
Volker David Kirchner
Matthias Kirschnereit
Sándor Kónya
Helmut Kretschmar
Diether de la Motte
Geoffrey Moull
Marita Napier
Petra Schmidt
Vera Schwarz
Klaus Storck
Alexander Wagner
Cornelia Wulkopf
Karlheinz Zöller

Notable faculty 

Günter Bialas
Georg Christoph Biller
Johannes Driessler
Wolfgang Fortner
Werner Genuit
Nobuko Imai
Conrad Hansen
Koh Gabriel Kameda
Rudolf Kelterborn
Giselher Klebe
Richard Rudolf Klein
Dieter Klöcker
Helmut Kretschmar
Fabien Lévy
André Navarra
Christoph Poppen
Roland Pröll
Thomas Quasthoff
Kurt Redel
Hans Richter-Haaser
Kurt Thomas
Tibor Varga
Alexander Wagner
Günther Weißenborn
Helmut Winschermann

International relations 
The Hochschule für Musik Detmold partners with the following institutions:

University of Sydney (Australia)
Pontificia Universidad Católica de Chile
Sibelius Academy Helsinki (Finland)
Pirkanmaa Polytechnic, School of Music, Tampere (Finland)
Conservatoire National Superieur et de Danse de Paris (France)
Hogeschool voor de Kunsten Utrecht (Netherlands)
Hogeschool voor Muziek en Dans in Rotterdam (Netherlands)
Koninklijk Conservatorium Den Haag (Netherlands)
Conservatorium van Amsterdam (Netherlands)
Erasmus Hogeschool Brussel (Belgium)
Universität für Musik und Darstellende Kunst in Wien (Austria)
Akademia Muzyczna Kraków (Poland)
Jan Dlugosz University Czenstochowa (Poland)
Royal College of Music Stockholm (Sweden)
Academy of Music and Dramatic Arts in Bratislava (Slowakia)
University of Ljubljana (Academy of Music) (Slovenia)
Real Conservatorio Superior de Musica de Madrid (Spain)
Conservatorio Superior de Music de Salamanca (Spain)
Academy of Performing Arts, Music Faculty in Prague (Tchechia)
Academy of Music in Lodz (Poland)
Liszt Ferenc Zenemüveszeti Egyetem Budapest (Hungary)
Karol Lipinski Academy of Music Wroclaw (Poland)
Taipei National University of the Arts (Taiwan)

See also
Music schools in Germany

External links 

Alumni Association

 
Detmold
Universities and colleges in North Rhine-Westphalia
Educational institutions established in 1946
1946 establishments in Germany
Music schools in Germany